CHIM-FM-5 was a Canadian radio station, operating at 93.1 FM in Red Deer, Alberta, Canada. Although licensed as a rebroadcaster of CHIM-FM in Timmins, Ontario, the Red Deer station aired some unique local programming and on-air staff and had its own logo not used by any of the other CHIM stations.

CHIM-FM was given approval by the CRTC on June 7, 2000, to add a rebroadcaster at Red Deer. CHIM-FM's licence renewal application was denied by the CRTC on October 23, 2012 due to regulatory violations. As CHIM-FM-5 is licensed as a rebroadcaster of CHIM-FM, it must cease broadcasting at the end of the broadcast day on November 30, 2012.

References

External links
CHIM-FM Red Deer

Him-Fm-5
Him-Fm-5
Him-Fm-5
Radio stations established in 2000
Radio stations disestablished in 2012
2000 establishments in Alberta
2012 disestablishments in Alberta
HIM-FM-5